Six-time defending champions Peter Fleming and John McEnroe successfully defended their title, defeating Mark Edmondson and Sherwood Stewart in the final, 6–3, 6–1 to win the doubles tennis title at the 1984 Masters Grand Prix. Their seven consecutive titles at the event remains a record.

Draw

Finals

References
1984 Masters-Doubles

Doubles